Kain is a masculine given name. Notable people with the name include:

Kain Bond (born 1985), English footballer
Kain Colter (born 1990), American football wide receiver
Kain Kong, American bass player from The Lookouts 
Kain Massin, Australian writer
Kain O'Keeffe (born 1987), Australian actor
Kain Tapper (1930–2004), Finnish sculptor
Kain Taylor (born 1967), Australian footballer

Fictional characters:
Kain Highwind in the Square Co., Ltd. game Final Fantasy IV
Kain Phalanx from Shadow Skill
 Kain Pathos Crow, a dog-headed biochemist featured in several articles and stories produced for the SCP Foundation. Created by a retired administrator for the SCP Foundation website of the same username.

See also
 Kain (surname)
 Kain (disambiguation)

Masculine given names